The Christian Council of Mozambique (Conselho Cristão de Moçambique) is an ecumenical Christian organization in Mozambique. It was founded in 1948 and is a member of the World Council of Churches and the Fellowship of Christian Councils in Southern Africa.

External links  
Official website
World Council of Churches listing

Christian organizations established in 1948
Members of the World Council of Churches
Christian organizations based in Africa
Christianity in Mozambique
Mozambique
1948 establishments in Portuguese Mozambique
Religious organisations based in Mozambique